is a potentially active volcano located on the borders of Gifu and Nagano prefectures in Japan. It is part of the Hida Mountains and is listed among the 100 Famous Japanese Mountains and the New 100 Famous Japanese Mountains.

Outline
The mountain is located on the borders of Gifu and Nagano prefectures in Chūbu-Sangaku National Park.

The Norikura Plateau borders the mountain on its northern side in Nagano Prefecture. The mountain, whose name means "riding saddle," received its name because its shape looks like a horse saddle.
It is known for being the easiest to climb among the mountains in Japan that are above 3000-meters.

History 
 1680s - It is said that Enkū was the first to reach the peak.
 1878 - Englishman William Gowland  became the first non-Japanese man to reach the peak.
 1892 - Englishman Walter Weston climbed on the peak.
 December 4, 1934 - This area was specified to the Chūbu-Sangaku National Park.
 1973 - Norikura Skyline to the vicinity of the top of a mountain was opened. It is the road that exists in the highest place in Japan.

Nature
After Mount Fuji and Mount Ontake, Mount Norikura is the third tallest volcano in Japan. It is a stratovolcano and hardened lava flows can still be seen near the peak. There are eight plains and 12 crater lakes on the mountain that were formed by volcanic activity. The Norikura Skyline is a road through the mountain, but it has to be closed for much of the year because of heavy snow fall. Even in the summer, some snow remains on the northeastern face of the mountain.

Plant and animal life
Mount Norikura has a variety of plant and animal life on its slopes. In addition to the alpine accentor and martins, the rock ptarmigan (one of Japan's natural monuments) also makes its home on the mountain.

There are various alpine plants and other flowers, including rhododendrons, lilies, and komakusa.

Geography

Geological features
Mount Kengamine (剣ヶ峰 Kengamine), one peak on the mountain, was formed in two eruptions 9,600 and 9,200 years ago. Mount Ebisu (恵比寿岳 Ebisu-dake), another peak, was formed during an eruption 2,000 years ago. Though the volcano has lost some of its eruptive power, volcanic gas is still escaping through the Yū River (湯川 Yū-gawa) and there are many spa areas in the surrounding area.

River of source 
Each following river of the source flows to the Sea of Japan or Ise Bay. 
 Tributary of Azusa River that joins to the Shinano River
 Tributary of Takahara River
 Tributary of Hida River

See also 
 Chūbu-Sangaku National Park
 Hida Mountains
 Three-thousanders (in Japan)
 100 Famous Japanese Mountains
 List of mountains in Japan
 List of volcanoes in Japan
 Volcano

References

External links 

 Norikuradake - Japan Meteorological Agency 
  - Japan Meteorological Agency
 Norikura Dake - Geological Survey of Japan
 

Hida Mountains
Mountains of Gifu Prefecture
Mountains of Nagano Prefecture
Volcanoes of Honshū
Volcanoes of Gifu Prefecture
Volcanoes of Nagano Prefecture